Robert More (c. 1377 – 4 March 1422) of Stinsford, Dorset, was an English politician.

More was a Member of Parliament for Dorset in 1417.

References

1377 births
1422 deaths
English MPs 1420
Politicians from Dorset